Ashalata Wabgaonkar (2 July 1941 – 22 September 2020) commonly known as Ashalata, was an Indian actress. Originally tracing her roots to Goa's Palolem village in Canacona taluka (or 'sub-district'), she was associated with the Mumbai-based Goa Hindu Association. She acted in over a hundred Hindi and Marathi movies. She also sang some Konkani songs broadcast over the Mumbai station of the All India Radio.

Life and Education 
Goa-born Ashalata was also famous as a Marathi singer and playwright, besides being a film actress.  She studied at the prominent St. Columba's Girls High School at Gramdevi, and was a post-graduate in Psychology from the SNDT Women's University.
She first started performing in Konkani and Marathi plays.

Career 
She acted in more than a hundred Hindi and Marathi movies. Some of her Marathi plays are Guntata Hridhya He, Varyavarchi Varaat, Chinna (with Smita Patil and Sadashiv Amrapurkar) and Mahananda.  Her Marathi stage career took off with the musical play Matsyagandha.

She was introduced in Hindi films by Basu Chatterjee in Apne Paraye (along with Bharati Achrekar) for which she was nominated for Filmfare Award for Best Supporting Actress.  She starred in films such as Ankush (1986), Apne Paraye (1980), Ahista Ahista, Shaukeen, Woh Saat Din, Namak Halaal and Yaadon Ki Kasam (1985).
For appearing in Bollywood in Basu Chatterjee's film Apne Paraye, she bagged the 'Bengal Critics Award' and the Filmfare Award for the Best Supporting Actor. She played the role of Amitabh Bachchan's stepmother in the film Zanjeer. Ashalata has acted in many successful Hindi films including Ankush, Apne Paraye, Ahista Ahista, Shaukeen, Woh Saat Din, Namak Halal and Yaadon Ki Kasam.

Ashalata was a big name in the Marathi theater world too and made her dramatic debut in the role of Revathi in the play Sangeet Sanshaykallol presented by The Goa Hindu Association. The Marathi drama Matsyagandha proved to be a milestone in Ashalata's acting career. In this work, she also sang the songs Garda Sabbhoti Ran Sajni Tu Tar Chafekali, and Arthashunya Bhase Maja ha Kalaha Jeevanacha.

She received training in classical music and was a fine Marathi Natyasangeet singer. Some of her Marathi films are Umbartha, Sutradhar, Navri Mile Navryala and Vahinichi Maya.
Gard Sabhowati, a book authored by Ashalata Wabgaonkar and published by Lotus Publications, Mumbai, touches on the memories and journey of the author in the film industry.

Death
Wabgaonkar died from COVID-19 on 22 September 2020, during the COVID-19 pandemic in India in Satara, Maharashtra, while shooting for a Marathi serial (आई माझी काळूबाई) Aai Mazi Kalubai. She was 79. On being unwell, she was admitted to a private hospital in Satara, Maharashtra, and was found positive for COVID-19. She was taking a ventilator treatment. She died around 4.45 AM on the morning of 22 September 2020. Her remains were cremated in Satara itself by co-actor Alka Kubal. "She was put on a ventilator on Monday night after her oxygen levels fell drastically and died early on Tuesday at around 4:45 am. Her family couldn't come due to the ongoing pandemic and told us to cremate her in Satara and not bring her body down to Mumbai", Alka Kubal said.

Selected filmography
Tinhi Sanja (2016) Marathi film
Sunrise (2014) Marathi film as Radhabai (2014)
One Room Kitchen (2011) Marathi film as Joshi Kaku 
Mani Mangalsutra (2010) Marathi film
Police Force: An Inside Story as Revathi (Vijay's mother) (2004)
Beti No.1 as Savitri (Priya's mom) ( 2000)
Do Ankhen Barah Hath (1997)
Daava as Bhishma's mom; Stepmom of Arjun & Suraj (1997)
Agni Sakshi as Mrs. Kapoor  (1996)
Zordaar as Ravi's mom  (1996)
Fauji as Bansilal's wife  (1995) 
Insaaf Apne Lahoo Se as Laxmi H. Prasad - Mohan's mom (1994)
Prem Deewane (1992) 
Humlaa as Mrs. Devkishan Sharma (1992)
Zindagi Ek Juaa as Laxmi (1992)
Jhoothi Shaan as Savitri (1991) 
Khoon Ka Karz as Judge (1991)
Maherchi Sadi (1991) Marathi film
Saugandh as Ganga's mom (1991)
Pratigyabadh as Nun (1991)
Azaad Desh Ke Gulam as Sharda A. Bhandari (1990)
Kali Ganga (1990)
Shaitani Ilaaka (1990)
Bandh Darwaza as Kumar's mother  (1990)
Ghayal (1990) as Mrs. Ashok Pradhan 
JailKhana (1989) 
Kamla Ki Maut as Nirmala S. Patel (1989)
Mahaadev as Padma Singh (1989)
Apna Desh Paraye Log (1989)
Daata as Ratanbai (1989)
Billoo Badshah as Sumitra - Vijay's mom (1989)
Gair Kanooni as Mrs. Asha Dalal (1989)
Farz Ki Jung as Vikram's mom (1989)
Jeete Hain Shaan Se as Geeta Verma (1989)
Hatya as Vegetable vendor (1988)
Gammat Jammat as Mrs. Korde (1987)
Marte Dam Tak as Mrs. P.C. Mathur (1987)
Watan Ke Rakhwale as Mahavir's mom (1987)
Insaf Ki Pukar as Mrs. Jagannath (1987)
Woh Din Aayega as Sumitra (1987)
Ankush as Anita's mom (1986)
Pahuchey Huwey Log (1986)
Ghar Dwaar as Chanda's mother (1985)
Wafadaar as Mrs Daya Sagar (1985)
Rahi Badal Gaye (1985)
Karm Yudh (1985) as Geeta Kumar
Sarfarosh as Rani Urmial Devi (1985)
Zamana (1985 film)  as Sudha S Kumar (1985)
Navri Mile Navryala (1984) Marathi film 
Purana Mandir as Damyanti - Ranvir's sister (1984)
   All Rounder as Ritu's mom (1984)
Raaj Tilak (1984)
Sharaabi as Mrs. Kapoor (1984)
Aaj Ki Awaaz as Mrs. V.V. Deshmukh (1984)
Gupchup Gupchup (1983) Marathi film
Woh Saat Din (1983) as Maya's mother
Sadma as Mrs. Malhotra (1983)
Coolie as Parvati (Nathu's wife) (1983)
Love in Goa as Mrs. Merry D'Souza (1983)
Namak Halaal as Nisha's mother (1983)
Dil-e-Nadaan (1982)
Shaukeen as Sita Choudhury (1982)
Ahista Ahista as Kaveri (1981)
Apne Paraye as Sidheshwari (1980)
Chalte Chalte (1976)
Zanjeer as Police Inspector's wife - Vijay's stepmother (1973)

References

External links
 

Actresses from Goa
Actresses in Marathi cinema
1941 births
2020 deaths
Marathi-language singers
Actresses in Hindi cinema
20th-century Indian actresses
People of Portuguese India
Deaths from the COVID-19 pandemic in India